Pleurodonte josephinae is a species of  tropical air-breathing land snail, a pulmonate gastropod mollusk in the family Pleurodontidae.

Distribution 
The distribution of Pleurodonte josephinae includes:
 Saint Kitts
 Nevis
 Montserrat
 Guadeloupe
 Dominica

Description 
Pleurodonte josephinae differs in shell characters from the typical form described from Guadeloupe. In Dominica thicker- and thinner-shelled forms have been found, which require further research to establish their precise taxonomic relationship.

Ecology 
Pleurodonte josephinae  lives in damp litter on the ground. This species is generally associated with relatively undisturbed habitats at higher altitudes in Dominica.

References
This article incorporates CC-BY-3.0 text from the reference 

Pleurodontidae
Gastropods described in 1832